The Birmingham Bowl is a post-season NCAA-sanctioned Division I FBS college football bowl game played annually in Birmingham, Alabama. First held in 2006, the game is owned and operated by ESPN Events. The University of Alabama at Birmingham (UAB) also provides marketing, management and game-day operations support. The game was previously known as the PapaJohns.com Bowl (2006–2010) and the BBVA Compass Bowl (2011–2014). TicketSmarter signed on as the title sponsor of the 2019 game, making it the TicketSmarter Birmingham Bowl. From its inception through 2020, the game was played at Legion Field; beginning with the December 2021 game it is held at Protective Stadium.

The January 2021 edition of the bowl was cancelled due to an insufficient number of teams being available to fill all 2020–21 bowl games, following a season impacted by the COVID-19 pandemic.

History
The bowl marked the return of post-season football to the city of Birmingham, which previously hosted the Dixie Bowl from 1947 to 1948, the Hall of Fame Classic from 1977 to 1985 (which relocated to Tampa and became the Outback Bowl), and the All-American Bowl from 1986 to 1990 (which was canceled when the SEC Championship Game was awarded to the city).

In the inaugural edition of the bowl, played on December 23, 2006, the South Florida Bulls defeated the East Carolina Pirates, 24–7, in front of a crowd of 32,023. Running back Benjamin Williams of South Florida scored the bowl's first points on a 16-yard touchdown run less than two minutes into the game; he added a second touchdown during the first quarter and was named the game's MVP.

After being held in December for its first three years, the fourth edition of the bowl was played in January 2010. As a result, there was no game during the 2009 calendar year. The bowl was subsequently played in January through its ninth edition, held in January 2015. The tenth edition of the bowl saw a return to December, resulting in two editions of the bowl being played during calendar year 2015. The bowl remained in December through its 13th edition, held in December 2018. The 14th edition of the bowl was held in January 2020, thus there was no game during calendar year 2019.

With construction of a new football stadium on the grounds of the Birmingham–Jefferson Convention Complex, scheduled for completion in 2021, the Birmingham Bowl "would likely move to the new stadium."

Conference tie-ins
The bowl originally had a four-year agreement with Conference USA (C-USA) to match a representative of that conference against an opponent from the Big East Conference, but the bowl's officials later appealed to the NCAA for a recertification which was granted in late April 2008.  In 2008 and 2009, the bowl featured the ninth bowl-eligible team of the Southeastern Conference (SEC) and a team from the Big East Conference.

The game currently features teams from the SEC and the American Athletic Conference (The American). Should either of these conferences not fulfill their bowl commitments, a team from C-USA or the Mid-American Conference (MAC) will take their place, provided it is bowl eligible. Otherwise, the game will choose an at-large team.  This happened in 2008, when the SEC was unable to send a team; the bowl selected  North Carolina State of the Atlantic Coast Conference (ACC) to face Rutgers from the Big East, even though the bowl had an arrangement with the Sun Belt Conference at the time, and that conference had at least one bowl-eligible team it could send. This occurred again in 2022 when the bid was brought down to the Sun Belt Conference.

Sponsorship
From 2006 through 2010, the game was the PapaJohns.com Bowl, named after Papa John's Pizza, who became the title sponsor signing a multi-year agreement in November 2006. On August 6, 2010, Papa John's announced it would not renew its sponsorship, after having secured a sponsorship deal with the National Football League. Following the announcement, the game was temporarily renamed the Birmingham Bowl until BBVA Compass was announced as its title sponsor on November 4, 2010, officially changing its name to the BBVA Compass Bowl. The bowl was sponsored by BBVA through the January 2014 game, following which BBVA Compass declined to renew its sponsorship, and the game was subsequently renamed the Birmingham Bowl. The 2018 edition of the Birmingham Bowl was sponsored by the Jared brand of Sterling Jewelers, and the 2019 edition was sponsored by TicketSmarter.

Game results
Rankings are from the AP Poll from before the game was played.

Source:

MVPs

Source:

Most appearances

Updated through the December 2022 edition (16 games, 32 total appearances).

Teams with multiple appearances

Teams with a single appearance
Won (7): Florida, Ole Miss, Rutgers, SMU, UConn, Vanderbilt, Wake Forest

Lost (6): Boston College, Coastal Carolina, Kentucky,  NC State, Southern Miss, Texas Tech

Appearances by conference
Updated through the December 2022 edition (16 games, 32 total appearances).

 Games marked with an asterisk (*) were played in January of the following calendar year.
 Record for The American includes appearances of the Big East Conference, as The American retains the charter of the original Big East, following its 2013 realignment. Teams representing the Big East appeared in seven games, compiling a 5–2 record.

Game records

Source:

Media coverage

Except for the first two editions of the bowl, which were televised on ESPN2, the bowl has been televised on ESPN.

Notes

References

External links
 Official site

 
College football bowls
American football in Birmingham, Alabama
Sports competitions in Birmingham, Alabama
Recurring sporting events established in 2006
College football bowls in Alabama